Sibusiso Edward Hadebe (born 14 May 1987) is a South African professional footballer who plays for Platinum Stars as a left winger.

Career
Born in Standerton, he formerly played for Ajax Cape Town, Pretoria University, Jomo Cosmos and AmaZulu.

References

1987 births
Living people
People from Standerton
Association football wingers
South African soccer players
University of Pretoria F.C. players
Jomo Cosmos F.C. players
Thanda Royal Zulu F.C. players
AmaZulu F.C. players
Lamontville Golden Arrows F.C. players
Platinum Stars F.C. players
Stellenbosch F.C. players
South African Premier Division players
National First Division players